Running Blind may refer to:

 Running Blind (Child novel), a 2000 novel by Lee Child
 Running Blind (Bagley novel), a 1970 Desmond Bagley novel
 Running Blind, a 1979 three-part TV series by the BBC based on the Desmond Bagley novel
 "Running Blind" (song), a 2004 song by the American band Godsmack
 Running Blind, a 2002 album by Ken Hensley
 Running Blind (EP), a solo EP by Radiohead drummer Phil Selway